Walter Binene Sabwa Bwalya (born 5 May 1995), also known as Heriter Binene Sabwa, is a Congolese footballer who plays for Saudi Arabian club Al-Qadsiah, on loan from Egyptian club Al Ahly, as a forward.

Career
On 15 July 2022, Bwalya joined Saudi Arabian club Al-Qadsiah on loan from Al Ahly.

International career
He made his debut for DR Congo national football team on 11 June 2021 in a friendly against Mali.

Honours
Al Ahly
 CAF Champions League: 2020-21
 CAF Super Cup: 2020
 FIFA Club World Cup: Third-Place 2020

References

1995 births
Living people
Democratic Republic of the Congo footballers
Democratic Republic of the Congo international footballers
Association football forwards
Democratic Republic of the Congo expatriate footballers
Zambia Super League players
Egyptian Premier League players
Süper Lig players
Qatar Stars League players
Saudi First Division League players
Forest Rangers F.C. players
Nkana F.C. players
El Gouna FC players
Al Ahly SC players
Yeni Malatyaspor footballers
Al-Sailiya SC players
Al-Qadsiah FC players
Expatriate footballers in Zambia
Expatriate footballers in Egypt
Expatriate footballers in Turkey
Expatriate footballers in Qatar
Expatriate footballers in Saudi Arabia
Democratic Republic of the Congo expatriate sportspeople in Zambia
Democratic Republic of the Congo expatriate sportspeople in Egypt
Democratic Republic of the Congo expatriate sportspeople in Turkey
Democratic Republic of the Congo expatriate sportspeople in Saudi Arabia